Vasylkiv (also Vasyl'kiv) was an air base of the Ukrainian Air Force located near Vasylkiv, Kyiv Oblast, Ukraine. The base was home to the 40th Tactical Aviation Brigade.

History
On the beginning of Operation Barbarossa in June 1941, the airfield was host to the 36th Fighter Aviation Division of the Air Defence Forces, comprising the 2nd, 43rd, 254th, and 255th Fighter Aviation Regiments. 

Units stationed at Vasylkiv included the 146th Guards Fighter Aviation Regiment (146 Gv IAP) flying 41 Mikoyan-Gurevich MiG-25PD aircraft.  The regiment arrived at the base in 1950. The regiment was subordinate to the 19th Air Defence Division, which was reorganised as the 49th Air Defence Corps in June 1989. Both formations were part of the 8th Air Defence Army. The regiment was taken over by Ukraine on 1 June 1992 and then disbanded 1 June 1993.

The 92nd Red Banner Fighter Aviation Regiment arrived from Mukachevo (air base) in 1993, and was briefly stationed at the base before disbanding in 1994. The regiment was flying Mikoyan MiG-29s at the time.

The air base was the focus of fighting during the Battle of Vasylkiv, part of the Kyiv offensive in the 2022 Russian invasion of Ukraine. It was destroyed on 12 March 2022 along with its airstrip after Russian missile strikes.

Aircraft
According to Google Earth imagery, as of March 3, 2020
 35 MiG-29
 4 L-39 Albatros

References

1938 establishments in Ukraine
2022 disestablishments in Ukraine
Defunct airports in Ukraine
Soviet Air Force bases
Soviet Air Defence Force bases
Ukrainian airbases
Vasylkiv
Buildings and structures destroyed during the 2022 Russian invasion of Ukraine